The culture of Magadh is rich with its distinct language, folk songs and festivals. In ancient period it was known as Magadha mahajanpada. The present-day Magadh region split between the states of Bihar and Jharkhand, India. The major language of the region is Magahi.

Language

Magahi language spoken in south Bihar. It is Bihari group of Indo Aryan language. Around 16 million people speak Magahi as native language. It is spoken in eight districts of Bihar (Gaya, Patna, Jehanabad, Aurangabad, Nalanda, Nawada, Sheikhpura, Arwal, Munger), seven districts of Jharkhand (Hazaribag, Chatra, Koderma, Jamtara, Bokaro, Dhanbad, Giridih, Palamu) and in West Bengal's Malda district.

Culture
Magahi culture refers to culture of Magadh. Culture of Magadh has been rich since ancient times and the land has produced many important personalities who 
contributed in India's development. The land has been epicenter of various religious and political movements since 
ancient times. Buddha and Mahavira got enlightenment on this land and moved around the neighboring places for 
their religious preaching. Buddha advocated ‘The Middle Path’ for his disciples. He talked of Ashtangika-marga for attaining nirvana, which is liberation from the cycle of birth and death. Mahavira advocated rigorous asceticism for his disciples. Both Buddhism and Jainism stood for the reason of truth and non-violence. Sikhism also has 
roots in Magadh. Sikh's tenth Guru, Guru Govind Singh was born on this land. In nineteenth century, during struggle for independence against British, Patna became the centre for Wahabi movement. This movement was led by Sayyed Ahmed Shahid. It was both a political and religious movement. The movement was aimed towards reforming Islam. But for achieving this, reformers thought that independence from British was must. So they also acted against British.

Arts

Magadh has contributed a lot to the Indian culture. Mauryan art is the first imperial art in India. Ashokan pillars are unique and their incredible ‘finish’ is the pride of Indian Architecture. These pillars are carved out of a single rock. These rock pillars are polished in such a fashion that they appear to be made of metal. Such polishing is striking example of Mauryan art and the technique vanished after Ashoka.  A Pillar at Sarnath is one of the Ashoka's pillars. The four lions carved on the top of the pillar are chosen as the national symbol of independent India. There is Iranian influence on 
Mauryan art. In Indian history, Ashoka was first to use inscriptions for spreading his messages. He followed the tradition of inscriptions from Iran. The tradition of rock-cut caves in India begun with the Mauryas. Rock-cut caves in the Barabar and Nagarjuni hills in Gaya are examples from Mauryan period. These were excavated by Ashoka and his grandson Dasaratha for the abode of Ajivika monks. A glimpse of the folk art of the period can be seen in the Yaksha and Yakshani figures found from Mathura, Pawa, and Patna. The Yakshini statue from Didarganj, near Patna is the most famous one and shows Mauryan polish.

Religion
Gupta's contributions to the Indian culture are also remarkable. Hinduism reemerged in the form of Bhagavatism 
(Vaishnavism), Saivism and Saktism. Bhakti became central to the philosophy of Hinduism.

Hinduism also got 
influenced by Buddhism. Under this influence Vaishnavism imbibed Buddha as one of the incarnations of Vishnu. 
Sculptures and temples of Gupta period are milestones in the field of art. Guptas were first to use dressed stone for temple construction. Before this, temples were made of wood or other perishable material. 

Gupta period is known as the “classical period” in the genre of sculpture as they were a combination of spirituality and idealism into art. This 
combination gets reflected in the images of Vishnu, in Dasavtara Temple at Deogarh. The seated Buddha from Sarnath and standing Buddha from Mathura represent fully developed form of Buddhist art. Their radiant spiritual expression carved with grace and refinement makes them masterpieces (Lal ed. 2002). Paintings at Ajanta and Ellora caves were made during Gupta period.

Literature

Arthashastra, written by Chanakya, is an important literature of the period for 
understanding politics and administration in general.
Aryabhata, an outstanding scholar of the Gupta age, lived at Kusumpura, near Patna. He wrote Aryabhattiya, which talks about geometry. He was first to use decimal and thus gave a new dimension to 
mathematics. He was first to give right reasons behind eclipses. Aryabhata was first to utilize sine functions in 
astronomy. This age contributed Puranas and Smiritis to the Hindu literature. Kavyas such as Meghduta, Raguvansa and 
Kumarsambhava, dramas such as Abhijnashakuntalam, Mudrarakshasa and Devichandragupta are contribution of Gupta period to Indian literature (Lal ed. 2002). Guptas established many Universities for promoting education. Nalanda University was one of them. It was famous for education in religion and philosophy. Students from all over India, China, Tibet, Indonesia and Sri Lanka used to come here for studies. The famous Chinese pilgrim Hiuen-Tsang studied at Nalanda University. Hiuen-Tsang mentioned the glory of Nalanda University in his book Si-yu-ki. I-tsing stayed at Nalanda for ten years. He translated many Sanskrit manuscripts into Chinese.

Festivals
Chhath is important festival of Magahi people. Other important festival are Holi, Durga Puja, Jitiya, Teej, Diwali, Kajari, Basant Panchami, Vishua i.e. Magadhi New Year  and Holi.

Music and dance

Folk songs and folk dance are an important aspect of Magadh culture. Folk songs like Phaag and Chaita are sung all over Bihar. While Phaag are sung in the month of Phalgun, Chaita are sung in the month of Chait. Rajashah of Patna is a famous name in the field of Indian classical music. He has not only reclassified the Indian Ragas but also discovered a new musical instrument called ‘Thaat’. Rajashah also authored a book ‘Nagmat Ashfi’ on Indian music. Folk music of Bihar reflects the culture of its day-to-day life. Sanskaar geet like Sohar, Khilona, Khobar, Sumaangali are sung at various occasions like birth, moondan, marriage etc. There are different kinds of songs for each kind of festival celebrated in the region.

Various folk dances performed by local people in the area are: Dhobia Nritya, Karia,  Jhumar, Jhijhiya, Jharni Nritya, Jat-Jatin, Sama chakeva and Domkach. These dances are based on different religious, historical and social significance.

Cinema
Many movies also reflect the culture of Magadh. In the movie ‘Abhijan’, which was directed by Satyajit Ray, the actress Waheeda Rehman delivered her dialogues in Magahi.

Other famous Magahi films are ‘Maiyaa’ directed by Fani Majumdar and ‘More Man Mitwa’ directed by Girish Ranjan.

Painting
In the genre of painting, Magadh is known for its ‘Patna Kalam Shaili’. The influence of both Mughals and British are found on the paintings of this school. Along with carrying these influences, this school has developed its own local features which make them unique. The famous painters of this school are Sevak Ram, Hulas Lal, Jayram Das and Shivdayal Lal.

Notable people
Jarasandha, king of Magadha in epic Mahabharata
Bimbisara, king of Magadha
Ajatashatru, king of Magadha
Dhana Nanda, Emperor
Ashoka, Emperor of India
Aryabhata, mathematician
Satyendra Narayan Sinha, freedom fighter
Nitish Kumar, chief minister of Bihar
Mathura Prasad Naveen, poet

References

Indian culture by community